A Lego Brickumentary (also known as Beyond the Brick: A Lego Brickumentary) is a 2014 Danish-American documentary film co-directed by Kief Davidson and Daniel Junge, focused on the Danish construction toy Lego. The film was released on July 31, 2014. The film received mixed reviews from critics, who praised its appeal but criticized the promotional tone of the film. It grossed over $100,000 against a production budget of $1 million, although it fared better in home media sales.

Synopsis
A LEGO Brickumentary offers a look at the global appeal of the LEGO building-block toy.

Cast
 Jason Bateman as narrator
 Jamie Berard as himself
 Alice Finch as herself
 Bret Harris as himself
 G.W. Krauss as himself
 Dan Legoff as himself
 Nathan Sawaya as himself
 Brian Whitaker as himself
 Iain Clifford Heath as himself
 Trey Parker as himself
 Phil Lord as Writer/Director/Himself
 Christopher Miller as Writer/Director/Himself

Release 
The film had its premiere at the 2014 Tribeca Film Festival on April 20, and was released in theaters on July 31, 2015.

Reception

Commercial performance 
The film grossed $101,531 in theaters against a production budget of $1 million, in addition to $427,757 in domestic DVD sales.

Critical reception 
The film received mixed reviews from critics. Review aggregator website Rotten Tomatoes reports a 55% rating based on 49 reviews, with an average score of 5.41/10. The website's critics consensus reads: "A LEGO Brickumentary offers a cheerful overview of the popular toy that should satisfy diehard enthusiasts, but its aggressively promotional tone may turn off LEGO agnostics." On Metacritic, the film has a 51 out of 100 rating based on 19 critics, indicating "mixed or average reviews".

Peter Sobczynski of RogerEbert.com gave the film two-and-a-half stars out of five. Peter Debruge of Variety writes that the film feels like a "glorified DVD extra" for The Lego Movie. Spectrum Culture wrote that "Brickumentary is both interesting and informative as well as being fun. There may be no “other side” to this documentary, but it does, indeed, give great depth to the toy, its inception and evolution. It also manages, quite successfully, to never, ever be boring." Jordan Hoffman of the New York Daily News gave the film one out of five stars, noting "As a movie, it can be as annoying as stepping on a stray LEGO brick with your socks off."

References

External links
 
 
 
 

2014 films
2014 documentary films
Danish documentary films
American documentary films
Films about toys
Films directed by Daniel Junge
Brickumentary
2010s English-language films
2010s American films